Irving Davidson (30 April 1929 – 14 April 2022) was an Australian rules footballer who played with St Kilda in the Victorian Football League (VFL).

Family
The son of William Irving Davidson (1894–1950), and Doris Irene Davidson, née Dobbie (1895–1977), Irving William Davidson was born on 30 April 1929.

He married Catherine Jean Robertson in 1960.

Education
He attended Caulfield Grammar School from 1943 to 1948.

Football

Caulfield Grammarians (VAFA)
He played with the Caulfield Grammarians Football Club in the Victorian Amateur Football Association (VAFA) in 1949.

St Kilda (VFL)
Cleared from Caulfield Grammarians in April 1950, he played 26 senior games with St Kilda in the VFL over four seasons (1951 to 1954), kicking one goal.

Brighton (VFA)
He played in 12 senior matches, scoring 10 goals, over two seasons (1955—1956) with the Brighton Football Club in the Victorian Football Association (VFA).

Death
He died on 14 April 2022.

See also
 List of Caulfield Grammar School people

Notes

References

External links 
 
 
 Irvine (sic) Davidson, at The VFA Project.

1929 births
2022 deaths
People educated at Caulfield Grammar School
Australian rules footballers from Victoria (Australia)
St Kilda Football Club players
Brighton Football Club players